The Dutchess County Fairgrounds is the home of the annual Dutchess County Fair.  Open for over 160 years, the fairgrounds are open year-round and host a number of events.

Annual events include:
Crafts at Rhinebeck 
New York State Sheep and Wool Festival 
Hudson Valley Wine and Food Festival 
Rhinebeck Antiques Fair 
Classic car shows

In addition to these events, the fairgrounds are home to "Turn of the Century Village" with a one-room school, a working sugar house, and a cider mill.  There are plans to expand this exhibit.

Dutchess County Fairgrounds is located on U.S. Route 9, about 3 miles from Amtrak's Rhinecliff-Kingston station.

Fairgrounds in the United States
Rhinebeck, New York